Danny Van Haute (born October 22, 1956) is an American former cyclist. Van Haute qualified for the 1980 U.S. Olympic team but did not compete due to the U.S. Olympic Committee's boycott of the 1980 Summer Olympics in Moscow, Russia. He was one of 461 athletes to receive a Congressional Gold Medal instead.  In 1981, Van Haute was one of the original members of the 7-Eleven-Schwinn speed racing team. He did get to compete in the points race event at the 1984 Summer Olympics.

References

External links
 

1956 births
Living people
American male cyclists
Olympic cyclists of the United States
Congressional Gold Medal recipients
Cyclists at the 1984 Summer Olympics
Sportspeople from Tillsonburg
Sportspeople from Ontario